Pretty Good Dance Moves is an indietronica band from Chicago, Illinois in the United States. Their sound sometimes also labeled as electropop. It is influenced by 1980s new wave, electronic, pop and indie rock genres.

Career

Genesis of the Group
Pretty Good Dance Moves started in 2007 in Chicago after Aaron Allieta and Jimmy Giannopoulos met while bartending together in Chicago. Their parents are of Italian and Greek-Cyprian descent respectively.

Pretty Good Dance Moves' first songs were "P.G.D.M" and "Demons Dancing" which were recorded between June and September 2007. Jimmy and Aaron sought some female presence in the group and contacted Genevieve Schatz from the Chicago band Company of Thieves. The three started to create music together. Genevieve's vocal performances are featured on the earliest songs Pretty Good Dance Moves produced, which were written and recorded between January and May 2007. Collaborations would remain an integral part of the group's creative process.

Early acclaim
Pretty Good Dance Moves self-released, self-titled EP struck a chord with the Chicago Sun-Times music critic and former Rolling Stone editor, Jim DeRogatis. After a favorable review in the Chicago Sun-Times, the band got noticed by Chicago music goers and music journalists from publications like SPIN, Time Out Magazine, the Chicago Tribune and influential music blogs.

Pretty Good Dance Moves went on to win Famecast's award for best electronic video, which included $10,000 in award money and features in Billboard magazine.

In 2011, Pretty Good Dance Moves signed to Mad Dragon Records to release their first full-length entitled "Limo". The LP, consisting of 8 songs, was released on February 7, 2012 and featured vocals from Sabina Sciubba of Brazilian Girls.

Style
The music magazine Spin magazine has compared their earliest songs to indietronic band The Postal Service. Pretty Good Dance Moves EP has also been compared to James Murphy's house music project LCD Soundsystem, UK downtempo group Zero 7 and the Brazilian Girls.

Collaborations
Pretty Good Dance Moves has collaborated with Genevieve Schatz from Chicago band Company of Thieves, American comedian Kristen Schaal famously known from HBO series Flight of the Conchords in the making of the music video for the song "Demons Dancing" and America's Next Top Model runner up Shandy Sullivan in the making of the music video for "In the Heat of the Night". The band is currently working on collaborations with members of Chicago indie rock group The Changes and Chicago electronic rock band Walter Meego.

References

External links
 Pretty Good Dance Moves official website
 Video of a live performance by Pretty Good Dance Moves with G. Schatz recorded for KEXP90.3FM

Electronic music groups from Illinois
Indie rock musical groups from Illinois
Musical groups from Chicago